Martin Ticháček (born 15 September 1981) is a Czech football coach and a former player. His position was goalkeeper.

External links
 Profile at iDNES.cz

1981 births
People from Klatovy
Living people
Czech footballers
Association football goalkeepers
Czech First League players
FC Viktoria Plzeň players
Sportspeople from the Plzeň Region